August Ludwig Weizenberg (6 April 1837 – 22 November 1921) was an Estonian sculptor. 

Weizenberg was born in the inn of Ritsike, near Kanepi, southeast Estonia. Weizenberg's father was a shoemaker and he learnt how to carve wood in Erastvere from 1858 to 1862. During the 1860s, he worked as a cabinetmaker in Frankfurt and Berlin. Thanks to a sponsorship from Friedrich Reinhold Kreutzwald, he travelled to Saint Petersburg where he was trained by Alexander von Bock. He later studied at the Imperial Academy of Arts, and from 1870 to 1873 at the Academy of Fine Arts, Munich. From 1873 to 1890, he lived in Rome.

References

 Jüri Hain: Eesti kunsti suurus ja viletsus. 150 aastat August Weizenbergi sünnist. In: Looming Nr 4 (1987), S. 528–539
 Heini Paas: August Weizenberg 1837–1921. Tallinn 1999.

External links

  kesknadal.ee
 pilt.delfi.ee 

1837 births
1921 deaths
People from Kanepi Parish
People from the Governorate of Livonia
Architectural sculptors
19th-century Estonian male artists
20th-century Estonian sculptors
20th-century Estonian male artists